Chamaeraphis is a genus of Australian plants in the grass family. The only recognized species is Chamaeraphis hordeacea, found in Queensland and Northern Territory.

formerly included
Dozens of other names have been coined at the specific and varietal levels, considered at the time as members of Chamaeraphis but now regarded as better suited to other genera, including Chrysopogon Echinochloa Ixophorus Panicum Paratheria Pennisetum Pseudoraphis Setaria Setariopsis

See also
 List of Poaceae genera

References

Panicoideae
Monotypic Poaceae genera
Endemic flora of Australia
Taxa named by Robert Brown (botanist, born 1773)